Belsky is a Russian surname. When transliterated as Bielski it can also refer to a Polish family of the same name.

Three different families bearing the name were prominent in Russian history:
The Gediminid Belsky family of the 15th and 16th centuries
The Belsky family from the House of Yaroslavl
The Commoner Belsky family of the 16th and 17th centuries,
 a family of Russian government administrators. It flourished from ca. 1570 to 1611 and was not related to either the Gediminid or Yaroslavl families. The most prominent of them were Malyuta Skuratov (Grigory Lukyanovich Skuratov-Belskiy, died in 1573) and Bogdan Belsky (died in 1611).

Notable individuals bearing the name include:
Abram Belskie (born 1907), British sculptor
Alexei Ivanovich Belsky (1726-1796), Russian painter
Bielski partisans who fought the Nazis in World War 2
Franta Belsky (1921–2000), Czech sculptor
Belsky (cartoonist), (1919 - 1989) Margaret (née Owen) Belsky, a British cartoonist. Her husband was the Czech sculptor Franta Belsky.
Grigory Lukyanovich Skuratov-Belsky (fl. 16th century)
Harold Simon Belsky (born 1929), American musician a.k.a. Hal Blaine
Igor Belsky (1925–1999), Russian ballet dancer and choreographer 
Ivan Ivanovich Belsky (1719-1799), Russian painter
Jay Belsky (born 1952), American child psychologist
Josh Belsky (born 1966), an American (sports) sailor
 Meir Belsky (1923-2017), American Torah scholar
Nikolay Bogdanov-Belsky (1868–1945), Russian painter
Scott Belsky (born 1980), American entrepreneur, author and early-stage investor
Vladimir Belsky (1866-1946), Russian poet and librettist
 Rabbi Yisroel Belsky (1938-2016), American religious leader

See also
 Bielski, the Polish spelling of the name

References

Russian noble families